Lycée Pierre Mendès France is a senior high school in Ris-Orangis, Essonne, France, in the Paris metropolitan area.  there are 550 students.

References

External links
 Lycée Pierre Mendès France

Lycées in Essonne